Ciclos is the sixth album of the Puerto Rican rock band Sol D'Menta and their fourth studio album. It was released on August 29, 2006.

The album includes a cover of Bob Marley's song "Could You Be Loved".

Track listing 
 "Ciclos"
 "Castigos y Recompensas"
 "Desde Que No Estas"
 "De Vuelta en Ocean Park"
 "Indigo" 
 "Del Campo en la Ciudad" 
 "Could You Be Loved" 
 "Should Be One"
 "Cuarta Dimensión"
 "Fantasma"
 "Muy Tarde Ya"
 "Could You Be Loved (Rock)"

Personnel

Band Members 
 Omar Hernández - vocals
 Erick "Jey" Seda - bass
 Miguel "Tito" Rodríguez - guitar
 Ernesto "Che" Rodríguez - drums

Technical members 
 Recorded and Produced by Miguel "Tito" Rodríguez at T&C Recording Studio, Mayaguez, Puerto Rico
 Mixed by Bob St. John at PDQ Studio, Hollywood, Florida
 Mastered by George Marino at Sterling Sound, New York City
 Executive Producer - Albert Morales
 Co-executive producers - John "MetalKid" Rodríguez & Erick Seda

Sol D'Menta albums
2006 albums